Local elections were held in Malaya in 1962. They were dominated by the Alliance Party, which won 1,788 of the 2,419 seats available.

Results

Local councils election

Province Wellesley

References

1962
Malaya
1962 elections in Malaya